Sri Lanka is an island close to the southern end of India with a tropical environment. The invertebrate fauna is as large as it is common to other regions of the world. There are about two million species of arthropods found in the world, and still it is counting with many new species still being discovered. It is very complicated and difficult to summarize the exact number of species found within a certain region.

The following list provide the isopods of Sri Lanka.

Isopods
Phylum: Arthropoda
Class: Insecta
Order: Isopoda

Isopods also known as sowbugs, are crustaceans, that can be found throughout marine, freshwater and terrestrial ecosystems. There are well over 10,000 species of isopods described within 11 suborders. From these, about 4,500 species are marine, 500 species are freshwater and 5,000 are terrestrial forms. They are typically flattened dorsoventrally with two pairs of antennae, seven pairs of jointed limbs on thorax, and five pairs of branching appendages on the abdomen.

The studies on isopods of Sri Lanka clearly studied with the separation of aquatic isopods and terrestrial isopods. Regarding freshwater isopods, the first taxonomic work was done by Fernando and Hanek in 1973. They recorded only two isopods from freshwater bodies in Sri Lanka.

The two terrestrial families of isopods, Trachelipidae and Porcellionidae have been studied by Ferrara and Argano. According to them, three species of Trachelipidae and five of Porcellionidae are recorded from Sri Lanka.
 
The following checklist on Sri Lankan isopods described 92 species within 53 genera.

Family: Aegidae
Aegiochus vigilans
Alitropus typus
Rocinela orientalis

Family: Agnaridae
Agnara fragilis
Agnara taprobanica

Family: Anthuridae
Amakusanthura moragallae
Apanthura stocki
Cyathura bentotae
Cyathura indica
Cyathura pusilla
Haliophasma poorei
Mesanthura maculata

Family: Arcturidae
Amesopous richardsonae

Family: Armadillidae
Akermania besucheti
Cubaris fritschei

Family: Cirolanidae
Anopsilana willeyi
Cirolana bovina
Cirolana parva
Cirolana sulcaticauda
Conilorpheus herdmani

Family: Corallanidae
Argathona normani
Argathona rhinoceros
Corallana nodosa
Lanocira gardineri
Lanocira zeylanica

Family: Cymothoidae
Anilocra dimidiata
Anilocra leptosoma
Cymothoa eremita
Cymothoa pulchra
Elthusa nanoides
Mothocya melanosticta
Mothocya plagulophora
Nerocila serra
Nerocila sigani

Family: Gnathiidae
Elaphognathia insolita
Gnathia taprobanensis

Family: Gnathostenetroididae
Anneckella srilankae - ssp. rectecopulans, srilankae

Family: Idoteidae
Synidotea variegata

Family: Janiridae
Carpias nana
Iais pubescens

Family: Joeropsididae
Joeropsis ceylonensis
Joeropsis curvicornis
Joeropsis indicus

Family: Ligiidae
Ligia exotica

Family: Microcerberidae
Coxicerberus singhalensis

Family: Mysidae
Lycomysis spinicauda
Mesopodopsis zeylanica
Siriella paulsoni

Family: Oniscidae
Exalloniscus brincki

Family: Philosciidae

Burmoniscus anderssoni
Burmoniscus bartolozzii
Burmoniscus beroni
Burmoniscus besucheti
Burmoniscus calcaratus
Burmoniscus cederholmi
Burmoniscus clarus
Burmoniscus davisi
Burmoniscus gibbosus
Burmoniscus loebli
Burmoniscus longicaudatus
Burmoniscus micropunctatus
Burmoniscus parviocellatus
Burmoniscus rowei
Burmoniscus setiger
Burmoniscus stilifer
Burmoniscus xanthocephalus
Littorophiloscia tropicalis
Philoscia mendica
Philoscia pubescens
Platycytoniscus granulatus
Serendibia denticulata
Sinhaloscia dimorpha

Family: Pleurocopidae
Pleurocope dasyure

Family: Porcellionidae
Porcellionides pruinosus
Porcellio scaber
Porcellio dilatatus

Family: Protojaniridae
Enckella lucei - ssp. lucei, major

Family: Scleropactidae
Adinda pulchra
Adinda scabra
Paratoradjia beroni

Family: Sphaeromatidae
Cerceis tuberculata
Cilicaea beddardi
Cilicaea latreillei
Cilicaeopsis whiteleggei
Cymodoce bicarinata
Cymodoce inornata
Dynoides indicus
Sphaeroma annandalei
Sphaeroma terebrans
Sphaeroma walker

Family: Stenetriidae
Hansenium chiltoni

Family: Trachelipodidae
Nagurus cristatus
Nagurus nanus
Nagurus travancorius

References

 
Isopods